João Ricardo Rosa Catarré (born 5 August 1980), known as João Catarré,  is a Portuguese actor and model.

Biography
Born August 5, 1980, Catarré is considered one of the most promising young Portuguese actors. In 1999, he worked as a professionalized model while studying IT Management at Lusophone University. He was the face of numerous advertising campaigns for television, and later decided to pursue "showbiz" professionally. Catarré took classes for actors (in television production) during this time. 

His first acting job was a protagonist role in the first television series of  Strawberries with Sugar playing the character Pipo. Catarré continued to act in television, commercials, and feature films; he also worked as a voice actor of animated characters, such as the famous superhero dog Bolt. Catarré, as it is known among his friends, still has natural aptitude for the sport, having joined the volleyball team of Sport Lisboa e Benfica. He also participated in various competitions of beach volleyball. Its rise came after his portrayal of 'Pipo' in Strawberries with Sugar, which was a series intended for a juvenile audience. The series is currently broadcast in Portugal, Romania, Syria and transmitted in Brazil. In Portugal , thanks to its popularity, is already in the air with his eighth (9th) season. A movie starring characters from the series was released on August 30, 2012

Television
 Recurring, Luis Fernandes in Amor Amor
 Recurring, Ramiro Neves in A Única Mulher
 Protagonist, José Belmonte in Belmonte
 Protagonist, David Campelo in Doida Por Ti
 Protagonist, Gonçalo Monforte in Remédio Santo
 Protagonist, João Monteiro Castro in Espírito Indomável
 Protagonist, Pedro in Deixa Que Te Leve
 Main Cast, Bernardo in Feitiço De Amor
 Special Participation, Olavo's Partner in Liberdade 21
 Main Cast, Camacho in Vila Faia
 Host with Patrícia Candoso on the show Destinos.pt
 Main Cast, Pedro Moura in Mundo Meu
 Additional Cast, Pipo in Morangos com Açúcar II
 Protagonist, Pipo in Morangos com Açúcar I
 Main Cast, Rodrigo Bastos/Diogo Moreira in Terra Brava

References 

 Morangos Com Açúcar
 Bolt

External links 
 
 Deixa que te leve - Site Oficial

Portuguese male actors
1980 births
Living people